Video converters are computer programs that can change the storage format of digital video. They may recompress the video to another format in a process called transcoding, or may simply change the container format without changing the video format. The disadvantages to transcoding are that there is quality loss when transcoding between lossy compression formats, and that the process is highly CPU intensive.

This article compares video converters that have their own article on Wikipedia.

Overview

Input

Output

Features

Help and support

See also 

Container format
Comparison of video container formats
Comparison of video editing software
WikiCommons' Theora video conversion help page
Comparison of DVD ripper software

References 

video converters